This is a list of the candidates for the offices of President of the United States and Vice President of the United States of the defunct National Republican Party and the defunct Whig Party. The Whigs were not a direct continuation of the National Republican Party, but most former National Republicans did join the Whigs in the 1830s. Opponents who received over one percent of the popular vote or ran an official campaign that received Electoral College votes are listed. Offices held prior to Election Day are included, and those held on Election Day have an italicized end date.

National Republican Party ticket (1828–1832)

1828

1832

Whig Party tickets (1836–1852)

1836
The Whig Party ran regional candidates in 1836. William H. Harrison and Francis Granger ran in Northern states, while Hugh Lawson White and John Tyler ran in Southern states. Daniel Webster was on the ballot in Massachusetts and Willie Person Mangum received votes from the Electoral College without being on the ballot.

1840

1844

1848

1852

Whig Party and American Party ticket (1856)
The collapse of the Whigs after 1852 left political chaos. Even though the party disintegrated, it continued to win some elections under its own banner, as the "Opposition Party", or as the American Party. The American, or "Know-Nothing" Party, formed from various prohibitionist and nativist movements, based originally on the secret Know-Nothing lodges. It was a moralistic party that appealed to the middle class fear of corruption, which it identified with Catholics, especially the recent Irish immigrants who seemed to bring crime, corruption, poverty and bossism as soon as they arrived. Remnants of the Whig party met once more in convention in 1856, and nominated the Know Nothing's nominees. While the Democratic ticket was focused in the South, and the Republican ticket in the North, the Know-Nothing ticket was on the ballot all across the country, providing alternatives to James Buchanan and John C. Frémont in every state which had a popular vote.

Constitutional Union Party ticket (1860)
The Republican Party was more driven, in terms of ideology and talent; it surpassed the hapless Whig/American Party coalition in 1856. By 1858 the Republicans controlled majorities in every Northern state, and hence controlled the electoral votes for president in 1860. The tattered remnants of the Coalition's southern wing, under the name, "Constitutional Union Party", ran a ticket in order to prevent secession. They were joined by a few anti-secessionist Southern Democrats. Nearly all of the Northern wing had already joined the Republicans; the only free states where the Constitutional Union Party garnered more than 3% were Massachusetts and California.

See also
List of Whig National Conventions
History of the United States Whig Party
Opposition Party (United States)
List of United States Democratic Party presidential tickets
List of United States Republican Party presidential tickets
List of United States Green Party presidential tickets
List of United States Libertarian Party presidential tickets

References

Whig Party (United States) presidential nominees
Whig Party (United States) vice presidential nominees
Whig